Martin Dew is a former English male badminton player who specialized in doubles.

Career 
Dew won two medals in the World Championships, a silver medal in 1983 for men's doubles and a bronze medal in 1987 for mixed doubles. He shared the mixed doubles title at the prestigious All-England Championships twice with Gillian Gilks (1982 and 1984). Dew is also one of the most successful players ever in the European Badminton Championships with four titles, one of them in men's doubles and three in mixed doubles.

Achievements

World Championships 
Men's doubles

IBF World Grand Prix 
The World Badminton Grand Prix sanctioned by International Badminton Federation (IBF) from 1983 to 2006.

Men's doubles

References
European results
English statistics
All England champions 1899-2007
Pat Davis: The Encyclopaedia of Badminton. Robert Hale, London, 1987, pp. 38–39, 

English male badminton players
Living people
1958 births
Badminton players at the 1982 Commonwealth Games
Commonwealth Games silver medallists for England
Commonwealth Games bronze medallists for England
Commonwealth Games medallists in badminton
Medallists at the 1982 Commonwealth Games